The third Central American and Caribbean Games were held in San Salvador, El Salvador, from 16 March to 5 April 1935. The games featured 741 athletes from nine nations which competed in fourteen sports.

Sports

Participating nations

Medal table

References 

 Meta
 

 
Central American and Caribbean Games, 1935
Central American and Caribbean Games
Central American and Caribbean Games, 1935
1935 in Caribbean sport
1935 in El Salvador
1935 in Central American sport
Multi-sport events in El Salvador
20th century in San Salvador
March 1935 sports events
April 1936 sports events
Sports competitions in San Salvador